My Life is the second studio album by American R&B recording artist Mary J. Blige, released on November 29, 1994, by Uptown Records and MCA Records. Many of the topics on My Life deal with clinical depression, Blige's battling with both drugs and alcohol, as well as being in an abusive relationship. Unlike her debut, What's the 411? (1992), Blige contributed lyrics to fourteen of the album's tracks, making it her most introspective and personal album at the time. Similar to her debut album, My Life features extensive production from Sean "Puffy" Combs for his newly founded label, Bad Boy Entertainment, which was at the time backed by Arista Records.

Considered to be her breakthrough album, My Life became Mary J. Blige's second album to reach the top ten on the Billboard 200 chart, peaking at number seven, and debuting at number one on the Top R&B/Hip-Hop Albums chart, where it stayed for eight weeks. In 1996, the album was nominated for Best R&B Album at the 38th Grammy Awards, while in December of the same year, the album was certified triple platinum by the Recording Industry Association of America, for shipments of three million copies in the United States. It also won the 1995 Billboard Music Award for Top R&B Album. In 1996, following the album's success, MCA issued a remix EP entitled My Life Remix Album which featured artists such as LL Cool J and Lauryn Hill.

A special commemorative edition of the album was released on November 20, 2020.

Background
Following the success of her debut album, What's the 411?, and a remixed version in 1993, Blige went into the recording studio in the winter of 1993 to record her second album, My Life. Producer Chucky Thompson was brought in and had originally been contracted to produce one song and an interlude for the project. He ended up being a last minute replacement as the producers Blige worked with previously on What's the 411? demanded more money when the album was certified triple platinum. Blige loved the one song Thompson produced for her, which made Combs change the direction of the album.

Combs called recording engineer Prince Charles Alexander out of the blue after Jodeci went to record Diary of a Mad Band. Alexander was brought in at the end of the record, after working on albums by other artists on Bad Boy Entertainment, such as Total, The Notorious B.I.G. and 112. In the middle of recording My Life, Combs suggested covering Rose Royce's 1977 hit "I'm Going Down", which he wanted Alexander to handle the session. However, the two butted heads over production credit issues, as Combs wanted to give credit to himself and Thompson, although neither were present for the song's recording session. Alexander fought hard to seek production credit from Combs and the two battled it out over the phone over the issue. Combs later explained it was due to receiving a flat royalty rate for producing the majority of the songs and Alexander's production credit would have interfered with the royalty rate. To circumvent this issue, Alexander insisted on having two more sessions with Bad Boy acts. One of the other songs he produced was another Rose Royce cover – "Love Don't Live Here Anymore" for Faith Evans' 1995 debut Faith. Alexander was later called back in to do some mixing and recording.

On the song "K. Murray Interlude", it originally featured The Notorious B.I.G.. He was taken off due to the song's lyrical content, which would have forced Uptown Records to release the album with a Parental Advisory sticker. Rapper Keith Murray was the replacement, while The Notorious B.I.G.'s verse would be released as the song "Who Shot Ya".

The album was a breakthrough for Blige, who at this point was in a clinical depression, battling both drugs and alcohol as well as being in an abusive relationship with singer K-Ci Hailey. In this period, Blige would once again dominate the charts with her singles: the Top 40 hit "Be Happy", a cover version of "I'm Goin' Down" and "You Bring Me Joy". The album uses primary soul samples from R&B musicians such as Curtis Mayfield, Roy Ayers, Al Green, Teddy Pendergrass, Marvin Gaye, Barry White, Rick James, and his protégés, the Mary Jane Girls.

Critical reception 

NME wrote that the beats "reign supreme" and commended Blige for "telling her audience she grew up the same way they did, listened to the same things, was influenced by the same situations." Village Voice critic Robert Christgau gave it a three-star honorable mention, indicating "an enjoyable effort consumers attuned to its overriding aesthetic or individual vision may well treasure". He cited "Mary Jane" and "I'm Going Down" as highlights while calling the album "an around-the-way girl's recipe for happiness". In a mixed review, Jonathan Bernstein of Spin found most of the songs too "ordinary" and felt that Blige's compositions "give her space to stretch out and emote, but for all the melody they possess they might as well be breathing exercises." Connie Johnson was more critical in the Los Angeles Times, finding it "drab" and devoid of attitude from Blige, who "doesn't add her own hard-core signature to any significant degree".

In 2002, My Life was ranked number 57 on Blenders list of the 100 greatest American albums of all-time. The following year, Rolling Stone placed it at number 279 on their 500 Greatest Albums of All Time, 281 on a 2012 revised list, and 126 on a 2020 list. In 2006, the record was included in Times 100 greatest albums of all-time list.

Accolades

Commercial performance
My Life debuted at number nine on the US Billboard 200 chart, and eventually peaked at number seven. The album also debuted at number one on the US Top R&B/Hip-Hop Albums chart and it spent a total of eight weeks at the top of that chart. The album would ultimately go on to spend 46 weeks on the Billboard 200 Albums Chart and 84 weeks on the Top R&B/Hip-Hop Albums chart. The album also charted in Canada peaking at number 37 on the Canadian Albums Chart, and at number 59 on the UK Albums Chart. On December 13, 1995, My Life was certified triple platinum by the Recording Industry Association of America (RIAA), for shipments of three million copies in the United States.

Track listing
Unless otherwise indicated, Information is taken from the Album's Liner Notes

Notes
  signifies a co-producer
 An early cassette promo of this album included two additional tracks "B.I.G. Interlude" (performed by Notorious B.I.G.) and "Everyday It Rains", however both of these tracks were removed from the final tracklist. "Everyday It Rains" later appeared on the soundtrack for the 1995 documentary film The Show and the 2019 Mary J. Blige compilation HERstory, Vol.1.

Sample credits
"Mary Jane (All Night Long)" contains an interpolation of "All Night Long" by Mary Jane Girls
"Mary Jane (All Night Long)" also contains a sample of "Close the Door" by Teddy Pendergrass
"You Bring Me Joy" contains a sample of "It's Ecstasy When You Lay Down Next to Me" by Barry White
"I'm the Only Woman" contains a sample of "Give Me Your Love" by Curtis Mayfield
"K. Murray Interlude" contains a sample of "I'm Afraid the Masquerade Is Over" by David Porter
"K. Murray Interlude" music also used for "Who Shot Ya?" by The Notorious B.I.G.
"My Life" contains a sample of "Everybody Loves the Sunshine" by Roy Ayers
"Don't Go" contains a sample of "Goodbye Love" by Guy
"Don't Go" also contains re-sung vocal samples of "Stay With Me" by DeBarge and "Speak to My Heart" by New York Restoration Choir with Donnie McClurkin
"I Love You" contains a sample of "Ike's Mood I" by Isaac Hayes
"No One Else" contains a sample of "Free At Last" by Al Green
 "No One Else" also contains a vocal sample of "La Di Da Di" by Doug E. Fresh & Slick Rick
"Be Happy" contains a sample of "You're So Good to Me" by Curtis Mayfield
"Be Happy" also contains a sample of "I Want You" by Marvin Gaye

Personnel 
Unless otherwise indicated, Information is taken from the Album's liner notes

Mary J. Blige – vocals (1-2, 4, 10–12, 15, lead on 3, 5, 7–9, 13–14, 16–17), background vocals (8-9, additional on 14, 16)
Andre Harrell – executive producer
Big Bub – additional background vocals (14)
Bassy Bob Brockmann – strings, additional keyboards (1), digital music programming (1, 3), recording engineer (3-5, 8–9, 11–12, 15), mixing (1, 3–4, 6, 8, 11–12)
Bruce Purse – trumpet (10)
Prince Charles Alexander – flute, piccolo flute, tenor saxophone (10), recording engineer (5, 7, 10, 15, 17), mixing (7, 10, 17)
Chucky Thompson – keyboards (9, additional on 8), instruments (4, 11–13, all other on 9, additional on 2–3, 5, 7, 14–15, 17)
Mr. Dalvin – arranger, additional instruments (16)
Darryl Pearson – additional bass (16)
Debra Young – production coordination 
Diane Monroe – violin (10)
Eileen Folson – cello (10)
Faith Evans – background vocals (8-9, additional on 14)
Frank Colon – percussion (10)
Fred McFarlane – additional keyboards (10)
Gloria Agostini – harp (10)
Herb Middleton – keyboards (8, additional on 9), all other instruments (8)
Herb Powers – mastering
JoDee Stringham – design
JoJo Hailey - background vocals (3, 8)
K-Ci Hailey – arranger, background vocals (8), writer, background vocals (16)

Keenya Mauldin – hair stylist
Keith Murray - vocals (6)
Kevin "K-Dog" Johnson - drums (10)
Latonya J. Blige – background vocals (3, 5, 13, 17, additional on 7)
Lenny Underwood – piano (10)
Lesa Terry – violin (10)
Mark "Led" Ledford – trumpet (10)
Nasheim Myrick – recording engineer (1, 3–7, 9, 11–15, 17), music programming (3)
Paul Pesco - guitar (10)
Rashad Smith – additional music programming (7)
Regina Carter – violin (10)
Rich Travali – recording engineer (2, 9)
Rob Paustian – recording engineer (15-16), mixing (16)
Sam Fine – make-up
Sante D'Orazio – photography
Sean "Puffy" Combs – executive producer
Sybil Pennix – stylist
Tim Dawg – associate executive producer
Tony Maserati – recording engineer (1, 5–7, 9, 11, 13–15), mixing (2, 5, 7, 9, 13–15, 17)
Victor Bailey – bass (10)
Vincent Henry – alto saxophone (10)

Charts

Weekly charts

Year-end charts

Certifications

See also
 Mary J. Blige's My Life
 List of number-one R&B albums of 1994 (U.S.)
 List of number-one R&B albums of 1995 (U.S.)
 Billboard Year-End

References

External links
My Life at Discogs
My Life accolades at acclaimedmusic.net

1994 albums
My Life (album)
Albums produced by Sean Combs
Uptown Records albums
MCA Records albums